The Gateway Singers were an American folk music group who achieved national prominence in the US in the late 1950s.  The group was included in the Smithsonian's Folk Song America compilation.  The group is best known for their song "Puttin' on the Style", which was later used in a beer commercial and sold one million copies.

Gateway Singers member Lou Gottlieb left the band, obtained his PhD in musicology from the University of California and then formed The Limeliters. Travis Edmonson left the Gateway Singers to form the duo Bud & Travis with Bud Dashiell.

The group split in 1961, however, three of the members Milt Chapman, Betty Mann, and Jerry Walter, continued performing as the Gateway Trio until, after releasing albums for Capitol Records, the trio broke up.

The Ed Sullivan Show reportedly cancelled an appearance by Gateway Singers, after executives from the CBS television network objected to showing a mixed-race group.

Discography
 Puttin' on the Style
 Gateway Singers at the hungry i
 Gateway Singers in Hi Fi
 Wagons West
 Gateway Singers on the Lot
 Down in the valley
 Live at Stanford 1957

References

External links
 Gateway Singers web site (copy at Internet archive)
 Fairmont Hotel August 21st, 1956 performance (copy at Internet Archive)

American folk musical groups